Plicopurpura is a genus of sea snails, marine gastropod mollusks in the family Muricidae, the murex snails or rock snails.

Species
Species within the genus Plicopurpura include:

 Plicopurpura columellaris (Lamarck, 1816)
 Plicopurpura eudeli (Sowerby, 1903)
 Plicopurpura pansa (Gould, 1853)
 Plicopurpura patula (Linnaeus, 1758)

References